Dzhida (Jada / Zede) is a rural locality (a selo) in Dzhidinsky District, Republic of Buryatia, Russia. The population was 3,178 as of 2017. There are 34 streets.

Geography 
Dzhida is located 65 km east of Petropavlovka (the district's administrative centre) by road. Dyrestuy is the nearest rural locality.

References 

Rural localities in Dzhidinsky District